al-Jārūd was a small city in the Wadi Hamar area, about 40 km east of the Balikh River in present-day Syria, inhabited during the 9th century. It is identified with Kharāb Sayyār, a ruin site covering 42 hectares and consisting of a square-shaped town surrounded by a system of walls and ditches. At its peak during the mid-9th century, al-Jarud was a minor regional center in the middle of "a flourishing agricultural landscape" on the fertile Wadi Hamar, with at least 60 contemporary settlements identified within a 13 km radius.

History
Excavator Jan-Waalke Meyer originally proposed that occupation at the site began during the Umayyad period, perhaps in the 730s or 740s, but has since revised her chronology of the site to exclude an Umayyad and early Abbasid phase at al-Jarud. In any case, according to Stefan Heidemann, al-Jarud was only built "to any significant extent" in the middle of the 9th century. At this point, the Abbasid capital was in Samarra, and the demand for agricultural produce was at its peak. The latest dated evidence found at al-Jarud is a coin fragment dated to the reign of al-Mu'tadid, between the years 892 and 902, and it was probably abandoned not too long after that.

Layout
The general layout of al-Jarud is almost identical to that of the nearby towns of Hisn Maslama and Tall Mahra. Like them, al-Jarud was surrounded by square city walls, 650x650 m in length and embellished with projecting half-towers. The towers served basically zero defensive purpose and were probably instead built as "symbols of urban pride and wealth in [a] small rural town".

Inside the walls, near the southeastern corner of al-Jarud, there was a large multi-roomed building with stucco decoration that possibly belonged to members of the economic elite. A geomagnetic survey revealed a large rectangular building with a large courtyard near the town's northwest corner; this building was probably a mosque. Excavation in the northeastern area uncovered a "series of abutting houses with courts, bathrooms, wells, cisterns, and nicely decorated walls". There was a bathhouse with multicolored walls, which later got turned into a workshop, as well as two large cisterns connected to a canal that flowed through the town's northern gate. Outside the walls, there was a structure that may have been a khan, possibly indicating that al-Jarud was a trade center of some sort.

See also 
Hisn Maslama
Tall Mahra
Bajarwan (Syria)
Bajadda

References

External links 
Kharab Sayyar's entry from the Museum with No Frontiers website

Former populated places in Syria
Syria under the Abbasid Caliphate
Medieval Upper Mesopotamia
Archaeological sites in al-Hasakah Governorate